Joseph Bengal Bates (October 29, 1893 – September 10, 1965) was a U.S. Representative from Kentucky.

Born in Republican, Kentucky, Bates attended the public schools and the Mountain Training School at Hindman, Kentucky.
He graduated from Eastern Kentucky State Teachers College at Richmond in 1916.
He studied law.
He taught in the rural schools of Knott County, Kentucky, from 1912 to 1915,
was high school superintendent at Raceland, Kentucky from 1917 to 1919,
and worked as county clerk of Greenup County, Kentucky from 1922 to 1938.

Bates was elected as a Democrat to the Seventy-fifth Congress to fill the vacancy caused by the resignation of Fred M. Vinson.
He was reelected to the Seventy-sixth and to the six succeeding Congresses and served from June 4, 1938, to January 3, 1953.
He was an unsuccessful candidate for renomination in 1952, and unsuccessfully sought the Democratic nomination in 1956 for the United States Senate.
He practiced law and was a resident of Greenup, Kentucky.
He died in Ashland, Kentucky on September 10, 1965.
He was interred in Bellefonte Memorial Gardens, Flatwoods, Kentucky.

References

External links

1893 births
1965 deaths
People from Greenup County, Kentucky
Democratic Party members of the United States House of Representatives from Kentucky
People from Hindman, Kentucky
People from Knott County, Kentucky
20th-century American politicians